Serbia has only one nationwide official language, which is Serbian. Other languages spoken in Serbia include Hungarian, Bosnian, Romani, Slovak, Albanian, Romanian, Croatian, Bulgarian, Macedonian, Rusyn,  etc.

Serbian language

The Serbian language predominates in most of Serbia. The Bosnian and Croatian language, which are, according to census, spoken in some parts of Serbia are virtually identical to Serbian, while many speakers of the Bulgarian language from south-eastern Serbia speak in the Torlakian dialect, which is considered to be one of the transitional dialects between Bulgarian and Serbian languages.

The Serbian language spoken in Serbia has several dialects: Šumadija-Vojvodina, Smederevo-Vršac, Kosovo-Resava, Prizren South Morava, Svrljig-Zaplanje, Timok-Lužnica (Torlakian), Eastern Herzegovina, and Zeta-South Sandžak. The Šumadija-Vojvodina and Eastern Herzegovina dialects are the basis for modern standard Serbian.

Throughout part of southern Serbia, a dialect by the name of Torlakian is spoken. Although it has no standard form and continues to be spoken without any form of official status, Torlakian may be seen by some as constituting a separate language. It forms a part of the South Slavic dialect continuum, and is transitional between the eastern south Slavic languages (mainly Bulgarian and Macedonian) and the western south Slavic languages (of which Serbian is a part).

Minority languages

Besides Serbian, which is the official language in the whole country, there are five minority languages in the official use by the provincial administration in Vojvodina: Hungarian, Romanian, Slovak, Rusyn, and Croatian. Serbian is the main language used by provincial administration and by all city and municipal administrations in Vojvodina. The other five languages are used by provincial administration and by selected city or municipal administrations. In practice, Serbian is a lingua franca of the region and number of declared native speakers of Serbian in the province exceeds the number of declared ethnic Serbs. Among other languages, Hungarian and Slovak are dominant in several municipalities, while other languages are dominant only in several villages.

In total there are 15 minority languages spoken in Serbia. Those languages are Albanian, Bosnian, Bulgarian, Bunjevac, Croatian, Czech, German, Hungarian, Macedonian, Romani, Romanian, Pannonian Rusyn, Slovak, Ukrainian and "Vlach" (name under which the Romanian spoken in the Timok Valley is known). The European Charter for Regional or Minority Languages was signed by Serbia and Montenegro in 2005. Republic of Serbia as the successor of the State Union of Serbia and Montenegro continue its legal obligations toward charter and it entered into force in 2006. In municipalities where certain minority constitute more than 15% of total population introduction of a minority language in official use is compulsory. Additionally, In province of Vojvodina, minority language and script which is not in official use on the entire territory of the municipality shall be introduced into official use in a settlements of that municipality if the percentage of given minority reaches 25% in that settlement.

Constitution of the Republic of Serbia stipulates that Serbian language and Cyrillic script shall be in the official use, while official use of other languages and scripts shall be regulated by law. However in recent times the Latin alphabet has become increasingly popular, especially with the youth. In addition, provision of Article 79 specifies the right of people belonging to minority national communities to preserve cultural identity, which shall also include the right to use their own languages and scripts.

See also
 Languages of Vojvodina
 Romanian language in Serbia

References